Clare Morgana Gillis is an American journalist. On April 5, 2011, Gillis was traveling with an anti-Gaddafi militia force, with fellow journalists James Foley, Manu Brabo and Anton Hammerl, during the collapse of the Muammar Gaddafi regime, when they were attacked by a rival group.  Hammerl died during the initial attack.  Gillis, Foley and Brabo were held as hostages.

Gillis had delivered the Doctoral dissertation in medieval history that earned her her PhD from Harvard University a year before her capture.

Gillis appeared before the United States Senate's Judiciary Committee on July 28, 2011, when it was considering a bill on improving US compliance with its obligations to provide consular access to foreigners the US government arrests.  She told the Senators that her own safe release had relied on her access to Hungarian diplomats.

Gillis was dragged by her hair, and beaten, by the fighters who captured her.

The rump of the Libyan government gave Gillis and her colleagues a one-year suspended sentence when it released them six weeks after their capture.

In an interview with WNYC Gillis compared the level of violence she saw in Libya with the violence one sees from those raised in families that experienced domestic violence.

References

American women journalists
Living people
Year of birth missing (living people)
University of Illinois Chicago alumni
21st-century American women
Harvard University alumni